The Bergistani, were an ancient Iberian or Pre-Roman people of the Iberian peninsula. They were related to the Ilergetes and were not numerous. They inhabited the valley of the Saiarra river in the upper course of the Llobregat in the northern Tarraconense.

The Bergistani were defeated by Hannibal during his overland journey to Italy. They are also known for having rebelled against Rome in 197 BC. The rebellion was put down by consul Cato the Elder. When they rose in revolt for the second time they were reduced to slavery. Livy mentions that the Bergistani had seven castles or fortifications. Their main castle, Castrum Bergium, could correspond to present-day Berga.

See also
Pre-Roman peoples of the Iberian Peninsula

References

External links
Detailed map of the Pre-Roman Peoples of Iberia (around 200 BC)
Archaeological Museum of Catalonia

Pre-Roman peoples of the Iberian Peninsula
History of Catalonia
Tribes conquered by Rome